"Wishlist" is a song by the American rock band Pearl Jam. Written by vocalist Eddie Vedder, "Wishlist" was released on May 5, 1998, as the second single from the band's fifth studio album, Yield (1998). In the United States, the song peaked at number six on both the  Billboard Mainstream Rock and Modern Rock Tracks charts. The song was included on Pearl Jam's 2004 greatest hits album, rearviewmirror (Greatest Hits 1991–2003).

Origin and recording
"Wishlist" was written by vocalist Eddie Vedder. Vedder used an EBow for his guitar solo on the song. According to Vedder about the song:
It was a stream-of-consciousness exercise. McCready booked studio time in a tiny studio here with our friend Stu behind the board and another friend playing drums. We don't have the discipline to sit down and teach each other parts, so you're writing simple chord changes that someone else can follow without having to take breaks to learn them. It was probably eight minutes long originally. I listened to the tape and picked out the better wishes.

Lyrics
"Wishlist" is about Vedder seeking fulfillment of wishes desired, but he resolves his wishlist with the line "I wish I was as fortunate, as fortunate as me." When asked about the song, Vedder stated, "I thought I'd lighten up." The line "I wish I was the full moon shining off your Camaro's hood" references the car that belonged to Beth Liebling, Vedder's wife at the time.
When played live, the song mirrors its roots as an improv, with Vedder changing the lyrics depending on his mood.

Release and reception
"Wishlist" was released as a single in 1998 with a previously unreleased B-side titled "U", of which an alternate version can also be found on the compilation album Lost Dogs (2003). The song peaked at number 47 on the Billboard Hot 100 and number six on the Billboard Mainstream Rock Tracks and Billboard Modern Rock Tracks charts.

Outside the United States, the single was released commercially in Australia, Austria, Japan, the Netherlands, and the United Kingdom. In Canada, the song charted on the Alternative Top 30 chart where it reached number one and became Pearl Jam's third single to top that chart. "Wishlist" also reached number 13 on the Canadian Year End Alternative Top 50. "Wishlist" reached the top 30 in the UK and peaked at number 48 on the Australian Singles Chart.

In his review of Yield, Rob Sheffield of Rolling Stone magazine said, "The gentle power-pop nugget 'Wishlist', a silly love song that Vedder composed solo, might be the simplest song Pearl Jam have ever done. But it's also the most moving."

Live performances
"Wishlist" was first performed live at the band's November 12, 1997, concert in Santa Cruz, California, at The Catalyst. The band played this song when it appeared on the Late Show with David Letterman in May 1998 in support of Yield. Live performances of "Wishlist" can be found on various official bootlegs. Performances of the song are also included on the DVDs Single Video Theory, Touring Band 2000, and Live at the Garden. In concert, the song is often extended, softly played, with a thoughtful outro jam, and sometimes segueing into another song such as the Buzzcocks' "Why Can't I Touch It". This can be heard on Live at the Garden especially.

On September 26, 2021, during his 2021 Ohana Fest solo performance, Vedder dedicated the song to the brothers Followill of Kings of Leon, whose mother died the night before, and were originally set to appear at the festival; as well to comedian and SNL alumn Norm Macdonald, who died a week earlier, and Vedder considered a friend.

Track listings
All songs were written by Eddie Vedder except where noted.

Standard 7-inch, CD, and cassette single
 "Wishlist" – 3:26
 "U" – 2:48
 "Brain of J." (live) (Mike McCready, Vedder) – 2:57
 "Brain of J." was recorded live by Triple J on March 5, 1998, at Melbourne Park in Melbourne, Australia.

European CD single
 "Wishlist" – 3:26
 "U" – 2:48

Charts

Weekly charts

Year-end charts

References

External links
 Lyrics at pearljam.com
 

1998 singles
1998 songs
Epic Records singles
Pearl Jam songs
Song recordings produced by Brendan O'Brien (record producer)
Song recordings produced by Eddie Vedder
Song recordings produced by Jack Irons
Song recordings produced by Jeff Ament
Song recordings produced by Mike McCready
Song recordings produced by Stone Gossard
Songs written by Eddie Vedder